Armadale Road is a major road in the south and south east of the Perth Metropolitan Area. It serves three purposes: firstly, providing a main route from Armadale to Fremantle; secondly, connecting Armadale to the Kwinana Freeway; and thirdly, since 2005, connecting it to the Tonkin Highway which ferries traffic to the eastern suburbs, Perth Airport and the Forrestfield and Kewdale industrial areas.

The road is signed as State Route 14 for almost its entire length, with the section west of Beeliar Drive unsigned.

History
Until the Kwinana Freeway extension in the early 1990s, Armadale Road terminated in Forrestdale. At this time, Forrest Road was the main road from Hamilton Hill to Armadale. The realignment of Forrest Road, as the Kwinana Freeway was extended, saw it renamed as Armadale Road up to the freeway (with most of the remainder of the old Forrest Road being renamed North Lake Road).

Prior to 2003, Armadale Road was a single carriageway from Lake Road in Forrestdale, to Solomon Road near the freeway. However, as part of the Tonkin Highway extension from 2003 to 2005, Armadale Road was upgraded to a dual carriageway from Lake Road to Anstey Road. This was done in anticipation of the large volumes of traffic expected due to the extension.

Recent upgrades
Following the 2017 election of Western Australian Labor to the state parliament, the controversial Perth Freight Link project was cancelled. This allowed for a new Commonwealth-State agreement to be reached, which would allow for $2.3 billion of funding to be relocated to other road projects. Two of these projects were the $145 million Armadale Road dual carriage upgrade between Anstey Road and Tapper Road, as well as the $237 million North Lake Road bridge over Kwinana Freeway.

Anstey Road to Tapper Road
Work commenced on 7 March 2018, with Premier Mark McGowan, Federal Minister for Urban Infrastructure and Cities Paul Fletcher and State Transport Minister Rita Saffioti turning the first sod on the project. It was completed by February 2020.

The project involved the widening of the road to a dual carriageway. The intersection with Nicholson Road, one of the state's worst black spots, was upgraded to a bridge over a roundabout with the bridge named the Hugo Throssell VC Bridge after the late Victoria Cross Recipient. A shared path for pedestrians and cyclists was built adjacent to the road, with various facilities being installed along the length of the road. This was opened in March 2020. The upgrade also delivered new roundabouts at the intersection with Liddelow Road and at the intersection with Taylor Road and Wright Road, as well as upgrades at the Ghostgum Avenue intersection.

Armadale Road to North Lake Road Bridge

This project involved the construction of a bridge over Kwinana Freeway with north-facing on and off ramps, connecting Armadale Road to North Lake Road. This removed another one of the state's black spots, the Beeliar Drive / Midgegooroo Avenue intersection, reduce congestion on the Kwinana Freeway interchange, and improve access to Cockburn Central railway station. Grade separated roundabouts will be constructed at Tapper Road / Verde Drive and at a new Beeliar Drive / Solomon Road intersection. Going westwards Armadale Road is constructed to pass over the former roundabout as an overpass bridge but then lowers to pass under the latter roundabout, leading to the intersections being termed a duck and dive interchange.

This project will link with the Kwinana Freeway northbound widening from Russell Road to Roe Highway, the aforementioned Armadale Road widening and the extension of the Thornlie railway branch to terminate at Cockburn Central. Construction commenced in late 2019, with the new roads opening to traffic on 16 December 2021.

Major intersections

Speed limits

See also

References

Roads in Perth, Western Australia